Neola is a city in Pottawattamie County, Iowa, United States. The population was 918 at the time of the 2020 census.

History
Neola got its start in the year 1869, following construction of the Chicago, Rock Island and Pacific Railroad through the territory.

Geography
Neola is located at  (41.450942, -95.617532).

Demographics

2010 census
As of the census of 2010, there were 842 people, 346 households, and 236 families living in the city. The racial makeup of the city was 98.8% White, 0.2% African American, 0.1% Native American, 0.1% Asian, 0.5% from other races, and 0.2% from two or more races. Hispanic or Latino of any race were 2.7% of the population.

There were 346 households, of which 38.2% had children under the age of 18 living with them, 51.4% were married couples living together, 11.3% had a female householder with no husband present, 5.5% had a male householder with no wife present, and 31.8% were non-families. 27.2% of all households were made up of individuals, and 11.2% had someone living alone who was 65 years of age or older. The average household size was 2.43 and the average family size was 2.98.

The median age in the city was 36.9 years. 28.5% of residents were under the age of 18; 7.3% were between the ages of 18 and 24; 24.8% were from 25 to 44; 24.8% were from 45 to 64; and 14.8% were 65 years of age or older. The gender makeup of the city was 49.3% male and 50.7% female.

2000 census
As of the census of 2000, there were 845 people, 339 households, and 247 families living in the city. The racial makeup of the city was 98.58% White, 0.59% Native American, 0.71% Asian, 0.12% from other races. Hispanic or Latino of any race were 0.24% of the population.

There were 339 households, out of which 37.2% had children under the age of 18 living with them, 59.3% were married couples living together, 9.1% had a female householder with no husband present, and 27.1% were non-families. 24.2% of all households were made up of individuals, and 12.7% had someone living alone who was 65 years of age or older. The average household size was 2.49 and the average family size was 2.96.

In the city, the population was spread out, with 27.6% under the age of 18, 6.9% from 18 to 24, 29.7% from 25 to 44, 21.3% from 45 to 64, and 14.6% who were 65 years of age or older. The median age was 35 years. For every 100 females, there were 90.7 males. For every 100 females age 18 and over, there were 93.1 males.

The median income for a household in the city was $47,500, and the median income for a family was $49,632. Males had a median income of $30,288 versus $23,182 for females. The per capita income for the city was $17,737. About 4.3% of families and 7.3% of the population were below the poverty line, including 11.2% of those under age 18 and 5.7% of those age 65 or over.

Education
Tri-Center Community School District operates schools serving Neola. Its high school is Tri-Center High School.

Saint Albert Catholic Schools in Council Bluffs takes students from Neola.

Notable people
 Red Downs, professional baseball player
 R. A. Lafferty, science fiction writer
 Red Morgan, professional baseball player

References

External links
 City of Neola, Iowa
 The Pottawattamie County Genealogical Society
 Tri-Center Community Schools Web Site
 Whispering Creek web site

Cities in Iowa
Cities in Pottawattamie County, Iowa